Spirtle may refer to:
Spirtle Rock, a columnar land feature in Scotland
Spurtle, a (typically Scottish) paddle or stick for stirring porridge